Gornje Cerovo ( or ) is a village in the Municipality of Brda in the Littoral region of Slovenia, right on the border with Italy.

The Cerovo parish church in the settlement is dedicated to Saint Nicholas and belongs to the Diocese of Koper.

References

External links
Gornje Cerovo on Geopedia

Populated places in the Municipality of Brda